The austral was the currency of Argentina between June 15, 1985, and December 31, 1991. It was subdivided into 100 centavos. The symbol was an uppercase A with an extra horizontal line, code point . This symbol appeared on all coins issued in this currency (including centavos), to distinguish them from earlier currencies.

History
Finance Minister Juan Vital Sourrouille devised the Austral plan. The austral replaced the peso argentino at a rate of ₳1 = $a1,000, making the austral worth US$1.25, or 80 centavos de austral per U.S. dollar.

In 1992, the austral was itself replaced by the convertible peso at a rate of $1 = ₳10,000.

Coins
The ¢ was only issued in 1985, whilst production of the 1¢ ceased in 1987, 5¢ ceased in 1988, and that of the other centavo coins ended in 1989. In 1989, ₳1, ₳5 and ₳10 coins were issued, followed in 1990 and 1991 by ₳100, ₳500 and ₳1,000 denominations.

Centavo

Austral

Banknotes
In 1985, provisional issues were made consisting of $a1000, $a5000 and $a10,000 notes overstamped with the values ₳1, ₳5 and ₳10.

Between 1985 and 1991, the following notes were issued by the Banco Central:

All banknotes except the provisional types show on the back an image of Liberty with a torch and shield. The provisional banknotes were produced from modified peso ley plates. On the obverses, the word PESOS were erased, whilst the reverse designs substituted the picture with the denomination written in words without spaces in several rows. The denomination was shown on both faces in the form ₳10 MIL (₳10,000), ₳50 MIL (₳50,000) and ₳500 MIL (₳500,000).

See also

La Década Perdida (The Lost Decade)
Latin American debt crisis

References

External links
 Official website of the Banco Central de la República Argentina (Argentine Central Bank)
 Argentine Notes

Presidency of Raúl Alfonsín
Modern obsolete currencies
Currencies of Argentina
1985 establishments in Argentina
1991 disestablishments in Argentina